Shahdari Zanjan Football Club was an Iranian football club based in Zanjan, Iran. This team was donated by the Football Federation of the Islamic Republic of Iran and started it's activity in League 2 in 1991. The uniform of this team was yellow. This team also had a history of participation and of course the championship of the Azadegan League in its record, but due to the financial crisis, it never had the opportunity to participate in the Persian Gulf Pro League. Due to the lack of sponsors and financial assistance this team fell from League 2 to the Premier League of Zanjan Province. And according to what has been said, the points of this team were sold to Yaran Ghadir Hashtgerd F.C.. By the way, This team was able to beat Persepolis F.C. 4-1 in a preparatory match.

History

Establishment
The club was originally known as Shahab Zanjan, competing in the Azadegan League since the 2002/03 season. In the middleof the Azadegan League 2005/06 season the club was renamed Daneshgah Azad Zanjan (Azad University Zanjan) due to change of sponsorship. In the Azadegan League 2006/07 season they were renamed again to Toseyeh Rouye Zanjan. They were once again renamed for the 2007/08 season to Kaveh Zanjan. They were again renamed Shahrdari Zanjan for the Azadegan League 2008-09 season.

Knock-out cup
Kaveh Zanjan reached the 1/16 Finals of the Hazfi Cup 2007-08 season, by defeating Nirou Moharekeh Qazvin in the third round. They faced Zob Ahan in the fourth round and managed to hold the Iran Pro League club to a 1–1 draw, but were defeated 4–1 after extra time.

Managers
 Firooz Karimi
 Mohsen Aghazade
 Human Afazeli
 Mehdi Monajati
 Mohsen Garousi
 Gholam Hossein Hosnavi
 Ali Nikbakht (February 2008 – June 2008)
 Bahman Amolor (June 2008 – January 2009)
 Reza Ahadi (January 2009 – June 2009)
 Hossein Rahmani (September 2009 – Jan 2010)
 Ali Nikbakht (January 2010 – August 2010)
 Reza Vatankhah (August 2010–Present)

Season-by-season
The table below chronicles the achievements of Shahdari Zanjan in various competitions.

See also
 2010-11 Hazfi Cup
 2010–11 Iran Football's 2nd Division

Football clubs in Iran
Association football clubs established in 2007
Zanjan Province